The mastoid cells (also called air cells of Lenoir or mastoid cells of Lenoir) are air-filled cavities within the mastoid process of the temporal bone of the cranium. The mastoid cells are a form of skeletal pneumaticity. Infection in these cells is called mastoiditis. The term "cells" refers to enclosed spaces, not cells as living, biological units.

Anatomy

A section of the mastoid process will show it to be hollowed out into a number of spaces which exhibit great variety in their size and number. At the upper and front part of the process they are large and irregular and contain air, but toward the lower part they diminish in size, while those at the apex of the process are frequently quite small and contain marrow. Occasionally they are entirely absent and the mastoid is solid throughout.

Development
At birth, the mastoid is not pneumatized, but becomes aerated before age six.

Function
The air cells are hypothesised to protect the temporal bone and the inner and middle ear against trauma and to regulate air pressure.

Clinical significance
Infections in the middle ear can easily spread into the mastoid area via the aditus ad antrum and mastoid antrum, causing mastoiditis.

References

External links

 

Bones of the head and neck
Ear